Veprecula arethusa is a species of sea snail, a marine gastropod mollusk in the family Raphitomidae.

Description
The length of the shell varies between 5 mm and 11.5 mm.

At the base of the body whorl, around the cauda, a faint brown band is traceable. The smooth furrow at the top of the ten whorls, their reticulated surface, and the rather produced but narrow siphonal canal are characters at once indicating this species.

Distribution
This species was found off Hengam Island in the Persian Gulf; also off Japan.

References

 Liu, J.Y. [Ruiyu] (ed.). (2008). Checklist of marine biota of China seas. China Science Press. 1267 pp.

External links
 W.H. Dall, Article: Notes on the nomenclature of the mollusks of the family Turritidae; Proceedings of the United States National Museum. v. 54 1919
 Bilolib.cz : image
  Melvill J.C. (1917). A revision of the Turridae (Pleurotomidae) occurring in the Persian Gulf, Gulf of Oman, and North Arabian Sea, as evidenced mostly through the results of dredgings carried out by Mr. F. W. Townsend, 1893–1914. Proceedings of the Malacological Society of London. 12(4): 140-186, pls 8-10
 
 Gastropods.com: Veprecula arethusa

arethusa
Gastropods described in 1918